Devin Cole Strange (born July 31, 1998) is an American football guard for the New England Patriots of the National Football League (NFL). He played college football at Chattanooga and was selected by the Patriots in the first round of the 2022 NFL Draft.

Early life and high school
Strange grew up in Knoxville, Tennessee, and attended Farragut High School. He primarily played defensive end at Farragut and was named the Knoxville Interscholastic League Defensive Player of the Year as a senior after recording 103.5 tackles, 18 tackles for loss, and 7.5 sacks. Strange was rated a two-star recruit and initially committed to play college football at the University of Tennessee at Chattanooga, but later de-committed and signed a letter of intent to play at the Air Force Academy.

College career
Strange briefly attended Air Force during the Basic Cadet Training period before transferring to Chattanooga and redshirting his freshman season. As a redshirt freshman, he played in ten games with six starts at left guard. Strange started all 11 games at left guard during his redshirt sophomore and was named second-team All-Southern Conference (SoCon). He repeated as a second-team All-SoCon selection as a redshirt junior after starting  11 games at left guard and the final game of the Mocs' season at center due to an injury. 

Strange started four of five possible games at left guard and won the Jacobs Blocking Award as the best blocker in the SoCon during redshirt senior season, which was shortened and played in the spring of 2021 due to the COVID-19 pandemic. He decided to utilize the extra year of eligibility granted to college athletes who played in the 2020 season due to the coronavirus pandemic and return to Chattanooga for a sixth season. In 2021, Strange was named first-team All-SoCon and won a second straight Jacobs Blocking Award. After the conclusion of his college career, he played in the 2022 Senior Bowl.

Professional career

Strange was selected by the New England Patriots in the first round (29th overall) of the 2022 NFL Draft despite many analysts predicting that he would still be available in the third or fourth round. He was named the Patriots starting left guard as a rookie, and started every game.

Personal life
Strange has a Bachelors in Psychology. He is currently working on a Masters in Engineering Management online from UTC.

References

External links 

 New England Patriots bio
Chattanooga Mocs bio

1998 births
Living people
American football offensive guards
Chattanooga Mocs football players
New England Patriots players
Players of American football from Knoxville, Tennessee